A by-election was held for the Lagos seat in the Legislative Council of Nigeria on 30 April 1926. It followed the death of incumbent Egerton Shyngle, who had been a member of the Nigerian National Democratic Party (NNDP). John Caulcrick of the NNDP was elected with 69% of the vote.

Campaign
Four candidates contested the elections; Caulcrick, a medical practitioner, was nominated by the NNDP, whilst the other three ran as independents. Two of whom had also contested the 1923 general elections – barrister Adeyemo Alakija and civil engineer George Debayo Agbebi, who had received 6% and 3% of the vote respectively. The final candidate was P J C Thomas, a businessman.

Results

References

1926
1926 elections in Africa
1926 in Nigeria
20th century in Lagos
April 1926 events